Valery Gaina (born 25 July 1956) is a Soviet-born Russian-American guitarist, songwriter, composer and singer of Moldovan (Romanian) origin. He is regarded as one of the best Soviet guitarists.

Career
Valery Gaina was born on 25 July 1956 in Căzănești, Telenești District, Moldavian SSR, in the family of Boris Alexandru Gaina and Catherine Tudor-Gaina. He graduated from middle school in Telenesti, and then from the music school in Soroca. He sang in the bands Cordial (from Tiraspol), Magistrali (from Blagoveshchensk), Molodye golosa (from Tambov).

He gained recognition in 1981, when he presented performances of great audience in the biggest halls in Russia, within the hard-rock band Cruise, where he also asserted himself as a composer. In the years 1985–1989, some Union and Republican charts classified him as the best rock guitarist in the former U.S.S.R. He approached the genres of hard rock, thrash metal and heavy metal. In 1988 he moved to Munich, Germany, where he produced two records with the trio Cruise. In 1991, he emigrated to Los Angeles, where he continued to produce music.

He currently lives alternately in both Russia and the United States.

References

1956 births
Living people
American heavy metal guitarists
Soviet emigrants to the United States
American people of Moldovan descent
Russian emigrants to the United States
Soviet emigrants to Germany
Moldovan emigrants to Germany
Russian emigrants to Germany
Russian heavy metal musicians
Russian male guitarists
Soviet guitarists
American people of Romanian descent
Russian people of Moldovan descent
American hard rock musicians
People from Telenești District
Moldovan rock musicians
Moldovan guitarists
American male singer-songwriters
Soviet male singer-songwriters
Russian male singer-songwriters
Romanian people of Moldovan descent